North Carolina's 55th House district is one of 120 districts in the North Carolina House of Representatives. It has been represented by Republican Mark Brody since 2013.

Geography
Since 2013, the district has included all of Anson County, as well as part of Union County. The district overlaps with the 29th and 35th Senate districts.

District officeholders since 1995

Election results

2022

2020

2018

2016

2014

2012

2010

2008

2006

2004

2002

2000

References

North Carolina House districts
Anson County, North Carolina
Union County, North Carolina